Yulia Alexandrova (born 6 March 1979) is a Russian rower. She competed in the women's single sculls event at the 2000 Summer Olympics in Sydney.

References

Russian female rowers
Rowers at the 2000 Summer Olympics
Olympic rowers of Russia
1979 births
Living people